Scalptia bicolor is a species of sea snail, a marine gastropod mollusc in the family Cancellariidae, the nutmeg snails.

Description

Distribution
This marine species occur soff the Philippines.

References

 Petit, R.E. & Harasewych, M.G. (2005) Catalogue of the superfamily Cancellarioidea Forbes and Hanley, 1851 (Gastropoda: Prosobranchia)- 2nd edition. Zootaxa, 1102, 3–161. NIZT 682 
 Verhecken A. (2007). Revision of the Cancellariidae (Mollusca, Neogastropoda, Cancellarioidea) of the eastern Atlantic (40°N-40°S) and the Mediterranean. Zoosystema, 29(2): 281-364
 Recent Cancellariidae. Annotated and illustrated catalogue of Recent Cancellariidae. Privately published, Wiesbaden. 428 pp. [With amendments and corrections taken from Petit R.E. (2012) A critique of, and errata for, Recent Cancellariidae by Jens Hemmen, 2007. Conchologia Ingrata 9: 1-8

Cancellariidae
Gastropods described in 1843